Tudak-e Taqiabad (also Romanized as Tūdak-e Taqīābād; also known as Taqīābād, Toodak, and Tūdak) is a village in Taftan-e Jonubi Rural District, Nukabad District, Khash County, Sistan and Baluchestan Province, Iran. At the 2006 census, its population was 82, in 15 families.

References 

Populated places in Khash County